Night Travellers at a Cross (Slovak: Nocni Putnici pri Krizi) is a painting by Hungarian artist László Mednyánszky from 1880.

Description
The picture was created in the first half of 1880. 
It has the dimensions 244 x 149 centimeters. It is in the collection of the Slovak National Gallery.

Analysis
The picture shows three people with bowed heads who pray at the cross in a dark forest at night. The composition's monumental scale is emphasized by the size of the travellers, as well as by the moonlight.

The theme of a cross in a forest - which has symbolized death - is seen regularly in Mednyánszky's works.

References 

1880 paintings
Slovak culture
Hungarian painters
Paintings about death
Paintings in Bratislava